Oeuvre(s) or Œuvre(s) may refer to:

 A work of art; or, more commonly, the body of work of a creator

Books
 L'Œuvre, a novel by Émile Zola
 Œuvres, a work by Emil Cioran
 Œuvres, a work by Auguste Brizeux
 Oeuvres, a work by Laurent Pariente

See also
 Chef d'œuvre or masterpiece, a creation that has been given much critical praise
 Hors d'oeuvre, a small dish served before, i.e., "outside the work" of, the courses of a meal
 Œuvres Completes, a work by Georges Bataille
 Œuvres Completes, a work by Louis Racine
 Œuvres Completes, a work by Louis Antoine de Saint-Just
 Œuvres Completes, a work by Alexis de Tocqueville
 Musée de l’Œuvre Notre-Dame, a Strasbourg museum also called Oeuvre Notre-Dame
 Théâtre de l'Œuvre, a Parisian playhouse
 Œuvre de secours aux enfants, a World War II-era humanitarian organisation
 Catalogue raisonné, a complete enumeration of an artist's oeuvre
 The Complete Works (disambiguation)
 Collected works (disambiguation)
 Opus (disambiguation)
 Louvre (disambiguation)